Electraglaia isozona is a moth of the family Tortricidae. It is found in India (Assam, Sikkim), Nepal, China (Yunnan) and Vietnam.

References

Moths described in 1908
Archipini